Menahem Ben (October 31, 1948 – March 13, 2020) was an Israeli poet and journalist and an outspoken literary and culture critic. He was a frequent op-ed contributor and authored two weekly columns, on culture and literature, in the Maariv daily newspaper, as well as a monthly book review page in that paper's literary supplement. He specialized in publishing provocative opinions, for instance that Charles Darwin's theory of evolution is  an "idiotic idea" (Haaretz, 30 November 2017).

Biography
Menahem Ben (originally Braun), was born in Dzierżoniów, Poland in 1948.  His family immigrated to Israel in 1949.

He participated in reality show HaAh HaGadol VIP (2009), reaching 3rd place.

Books
In addition to his work of critical writing in the Israeli press, Menahem Ben published eighteen books, including poetry, children's literature, translations and essays. In 2006, he published a volume of criticism: From Shlomo the King (King Solomon) to Shlomo Artzi.

Prizes
 In 1989, Ben was awarded the Prime Minister's Prize for Hebrew Literary Works.
 In 1998, he received the Bernstein Prize, in the Literary Criticism category.

External links
 Entry on Menahem Ben in Ohio State's Bio-Bibliographical Lexicon
 Menahem Ben at the Alternative National Design Forum
 Institute for the Translation of Hebrew Literature

1948 births
2020 deaths
Bernstein Prize recipients
Hebrew-language poets
Israeli journalists
Israeli literary critics
Israeli people of Polish-Jewish descent
Israeli male poets
Israeli television critics
Polish emigrants to Israel
Recipients of Prime Minister's Prize for Hebrew Literary Works
Big Brother (franchise) contestants